Monte Bicco is a mountain of Marche, Italy. It is 2052 metres high.

Mountains of Marche
Mountains of the Apennines